The Battle of Manga was a military engagement during the Second Portuguese-Brazilian invasion of the Eastern Bank that took place near Montevideo in what is now the nation of Uruguay.

References

Manga
Manga
Manga
1818 in Brazil
1818 in Uruguay